Erigeron schmalhausenii is an Asian species of flowering plants in the family Asteraceae. It grows on mountains and glacial moraines in Xinjiang, Kazakhstan, Uzbekistan, and Siberia.

Erigeron schmalhausenii is a perennial, clumping-forming herb up to 45 cm (18 inches) tall, forming a thick woody rhizomes. Its flower heads have pink or lilac ray florets surrounding yellow disc florets.

References

schmalhausenii
Flora of Asia
Plants described in 1877